Mauricio Hadad was the defending champion but did not compete that year.

MaliVai Washington won in the final 6–7 (6–8), 6–4, 7–5 against Marcelo Filippini.

Seeds
A champion seed is indicated in bold text while text in italics indicates the round in which that seed was eliminated.

  MaliVai Washington (champion)
  Javier Frana (semifinals)
  Jason Stoltenberg (first round)
  Michael Joyce (first round)
  Chris Woodruff (first round)
  Vince Spadea (quarterfinals)
  Fernando Meligeni (first round)
  Scott Draper (first round)

Draw

References
 1996 XL Bermuda Open Draw

XL Bermuda Open
1996 ATP Tour